The KUR EC4 class, later known as the EAR 54 class, was a class of  gauge  Garratt-type articulated steam locomotives developed under and for use in wartime conditions.

The seven members of the class were built during the latter stages of World War II by Beyer, Peacock & Co. in Manchester, England, for the War Department of the United Kingdom and the Kenya-Uganda Railway (KUR).  They entered service on the KUR in 1944, and were later operated by the KUR's successor, the East African Railways (EAR).

Class list
The builder's and fleet numbers of each member of the class were as follows:

See also

Rail transport in Kenya
Rail transport in Uganda

References

Notes

Bibliography

External links

Beyer, Peacock locomotives
East African Railways locomotives
Garratt locomotives
Kenya-Uganda Railway locomotives
Metre gauge steam locomotives
Railway locomotives introduced in 1944
Steam locomotives of Kenya
Steam locomotives of Uganda
4-8-2+2-8-4 locomotives
Scrapped locomotives